Seven Sisters Post was an Indian English-language newspaper published from Guwahati. It was first launched on 11 November 2011, by Saradha Printing and Publications Pvt. Ltd.

The newspaper mainly covered news of north-eastern India. Every Sunday a supplement was published, with the main newspaper dedicated to creative writing, including poetry, essays and stories.

The newspaper is closed and its website has also expired due to Saradha Group chit fund scam.

See also 
 The Assam Tribune
 The Sentinel
 The Times of India

References

External links 

English-language newspapers published in India
Newspapers published in Assam